Abraxas albiquadrata is a species of moth belonging to the family Geometridae. It was described by Warren in 1897. It is known from Ceram and Bacan.

References

Abraxini
Moths of Indonesia
Moths described in 1897